Kornél Ábrányi (15 October 1822 – 20 December 1903) was a Hungarian pianist, music writer and theorist, and composer. He was born in Szentgyörgyábrány. A pupil of Frédéric Chopin, and a close friend of Franz Liszt, whose music he championed, Ábrányi chiefly wrote music for piano, but also composed chamber music, choral works, and lieder. He began teaching at the Franz Liszt Academy of Music at its founding in 1875 and became its secretary.

He was one of several people to use the pseudonym Kákay Aranyos.

Ábrányi died in Budapest, aged 81. His grandson was the composer Emil Ábrányi.

References

External links

1822 births
1903 deaths
19th-century classical composers
19th-century classical pianists
19th-century Hungarian male musicians
Hungarian classical composers
Hungarian classical pianists
Male classical pianists
Hungarian male classical composers
Hungarian music educators
Hungarian Romantic composers